Hoseynabad (also Romanized as Ḩoseynābād) is a village in Derak Rural District, in the Central District of Shiraz County, Fars Province, Iran. At the 2006 census, its population was 105, in 22 families.

References 

Populated places in Shiraz County